Chang Si (November 15, 1986) is a Chinese retired competitor in synchronized swimming. She won a silver medal in team competition at the 2012 Summer Olympics.

Chang Si's paternal grandfather Chang Baohua was a famous comedian.

References 

Living people
Olympic silver medalists for China
Chinese synchronized swimmers
Olympic synchronized swimmers of China
Synchronized swimmers at the 2012 Summer Olympics
1986 births
Olympic medalists in synchronized swimming
Asian Games medalists in artistic swimming
Synchronized swimmers from Beijing
Artistic swimmers at the 2010 Asian Games
Medalists at the 2012 Summer Olympics
World Aquatics Championships medalists in synchronised swimming
Synchronized swimmers at the 2011 World Aquatics Championships
Asian Games gold medalists for China
Medalists at the 2010 Asian Games
Manchu sportspeople